Inga-Lill Kristina "Lili" Päivärinta (born 5 January 1966) is a Swedish singer and artist of Finnish ancestry.

Career
She scored a number of hits with the duo Lili & Susie, a duo with her sister Susie Päivärinta, in the 1980s and early 1990s, several of which made the Swedish music charts.

Päivärinta has been a strong proponent of animal rights since she was a child. During 2000, Päivärinta filmed how she cared for animals, which resulted in a mini-series on TV4 that eventually lead to the long-running TV4 animal show Djurens Ö, where she showcases her job as an animal lifesaver. She is a vegetarian. Themes about animal rights have been featured regularly in Päivärinta's music and videos. She contributed to the album Building On Tradition by Andy McCoy. She also appeared as a regular in the TV-series Djurens hjältar broadcast on TV3.

See also
List of Swedes in music

References

1966 births
Living people
People from Sundbyberg Municipality
Swedish people of Finnish descent
Swedish women singers
Melodifestivalen contestants of 2009
Melodifestivalen contestants of 1989